Elliot Ray Scheiner (born 18 March 1947) is a music producer, mixer and engineer. Scheiner has received 27 Grammy Award nominations, eight of which he won, and he has been awarded four Emmy nominations, two Emmy Awards for his work with the Eagles on their farewell tour broadcast, and the documentary film History of the Eagles, three TEC Awards nominations, a TEC Hall of Fame inductee, and recipient of the Surround Pioneer Award.  Elliot holds an honorary Doctor of Music degree from the Berklee College of Music and is one of the only Americans to be awarded the Master of Sound honour from the Japan Audio Society.

In 2016, Elliot mixed Phish live at Madison Square Garden over the New Year's holiday and their subsequent shows in Ixtapa, Mexico.  In 2015 he received his 25th Grammy Award nomination in the category of Best Surround Sound Album for Beyoncé, which he also won, making him an eight-time Grammy Award winner.

Career 
Scheiner began his career in 1967 as Phil Ramone's assistant at A & R Recording in New York City, and quickly advanced to engineer.  By 1973 he had begun to freelance as an engineer and producer, becoming the first person ever to work as a freelance engineer for other artists. Scheiner is considered to be among the most accomplished sound engineers and producers in his field [not identified].

Scheiner has produced and engineered a range of artists, including Foo Fighters, Toto, Jimmy Buffett, Beck, Faith Hill, Steely Dan, Band of Horses, Ricky Martin, Sting, Bruce Hornsby, Paul Simon, R.E.M., B.B. King, George Benson, Chaka Khan, Van Morrison, Donald Fagen, Fleetwood Mac, Queen, Eric Clapton, Jackson Browne, Eagles, Aerosmith, Joe Jackson and Glenn Frey.

Mixing 
Scheiner was nominated in 2005 for an Emmy Award for Outstanding Sound Mixing for a Variety or Music Series or Special or Animation, for his mixing for Eric Clapton in Great Performances; Eric Clapton Crossroads Guitar Festival (1972).

He mixed the IMAX film All Access: Front Row. Backstage. Live! (2001) in surround sound.  The film footage includes Dave Matthews, Sheryl Crow, Macy Gray, Kid Rock, Moby, George Clinton, Mary J. Blige, Al Green, and Rob Thomas.

Scheiner did the 5.1 surround sound mix of Roy Orbison's Black & White Night concert DVD and Porcupine Tree's In Absentia.

Scheiner mixed The Eagles' four-hour documentary, History of the Eagles (2013).  He also mixed Beck's reinterpretation of the David Bowie hit "Sound and Vision."  Scheiner also recorded and mixed Eric Clapton's Crossroads 2013 featuring Eric Clapton and friends at Madison Square Garden in New York City in April 2013.

In 2018 Phish released The Complete Baker's Dozen Box Set it includes every note of music from the historic 13-night run on 36 discs. Each show has been remixed for this release by Scheiner.

Car audio 
Scheiner also collaborated with Panasonic to create the ELS Surround premium audio system for Acura's RL/RLX, TL/TLX, ILX, TSX, RDX, MDX &  ZDX.  The audio system received rave reviews from the automotive press, audiophiles and musicians since it was introduced on the 2004 Acura TL. In 2018 Acura debuted ELS Studio 3D in the 2019 Acura RDX. The flagship system consists of 16 speakers, including 4 overhead speakers in the roof. ELS Studio 3D was most recently awarded Business Insider's "Car Audio System of the Year".

Scheiner once used the car to share a 5.1 mix with the Foo Fighters. "I sent them the mix, and they listened in the car. The first call back was, “Sounds great, don’t change anything.” They listened to the entire record in 5.1 in the car. So, it became not only a system for people who wanted to hear this kind of music, but for producers and artists to actually approve things. That's what I wanted. I wanted to take on the 5.1 market in cars and really do it big."

References 
General references
 "ELS Surround — From The Studio, To Your Vehicle" (about the system Scheiner designed), 

Audio
 "Behind the Scenes," Guitar Jam Daily 
 Interview Session 1, 28 March 2007
 Interview Session 2, 12 April 2007
 Interview Session 3, 18 June 2007
 Interview Session 4, 25 July 2007

Videos
 Elliot Talks About Audio Production," Scheiner interviewed by Johnny Jaskot,  (blog of Mike Banks, England)
 Elliot video blog, 
 
 
 
Elliot Scheiner Interview NAMM Oral History Library

Inline citations

American audio engineers
English Jews
1947 births
Living people
Grammy Award winners